Ghost Lake is a man-made reservoir in the Rocky Mountain foothills in Alberta, Canada.

Ghost Lake  may also refer to:

Geography
 Ghost Lake, Alberta, a summer village by the lake in Alberta
 Ghost Lake, several lakes in Ontario, Canada
 Ghost Lake, a lake near Bhimeshwar, Nepal
 Ghost Lake, a lake in Carbon County, Montana, United States
 Ghost Lake, a man-made lake near Shades of Death Road in Warren County, New Jersey, United States
 Ghost Lake, several lakes in Wisconsin, United States

Entertainment
Ghost Lake, an amusement at Conneaut Lake Park
Ghost Lake, a 1955 Taiwanese film directed by Joseph Kuo
Ghost Lake, or Shockers: Ghost Lake, a 1994 novel by John Peel
Ghost Lake, a 2004 American film filmed at Rushford Lake